Thomasin Harcourt McKenzie (born 26 July 2000) is a New Zealand actress. After a minor role in The Hobbit: The Battle of Five Armies (2014), she rose to critical prominence after playing a young girl living in isolation in Debra Granik's drama film Leave No Trace (2018), winning the National Board of Review Award for Breakthrough Performance. She continued gaining recognition with supporting roles in the 2019 films The King, Jojo Rabbit, and True History of the Kelly Gang. In 2021, she starred in M. Night Shyamalan's thriller Old and in Edgar Wright's psychological horror film Last Night in Soho.

Early life 
Thomasin Harcourt McKenzie was born in Wellington, New Zealand, to actress Dame Miranda Harcourt and director Stuart McKenzie. She is the granddaughter of actress Dame Kate Harcourt and Peter Harcourt. Peter's family founded the real estate company Harcourts International in Wellington. She has an elder brother and a younger sister, actress Davida McKenzie. She completed her secondary education at Samuel Marsden Collegiate School in 2018.

Career 
After appearing with her brother in the film Existence (2012), McKenzie portrayed teenager Louise Nicholas in the television film Consent: The Louise Nicholas Story (2014). In 2015, she played Pixie Hannah in the soap opera Shortland Street. The following year, she played the titular character in the children's comedy web series Lucy Lewis Can't Lose.

She gained recognition for her portrayal as a daughter of a war veteran in Debra Granik's Leave No Trace (2018). Her performance received critical acclaim and won her the National Board of Review Award for Breakthrough Performance. In 2019, McKenzie joined the ensemble cast of Netflix's The King as Queen Philippa of Denmark, starring alongside Timothée Chalamet, Joel Edgerton and Robert Pattinson. She next played the role of a young Jewish girl who hides in the home of the title character in Taika Waititi's satirical comedy-drama Jojo Rabbit (2019). 

In August 2018, McKenzie was cast in Top Gun: Maverick, but dropped out of the film after signing onto Lost Girls (2020). In 2021, she starred in the M. Night Shyamalan's thriller Old, and played the lead character in Edgar Wright's psychological horror film Last Night in Soho, opposite Anya Taylor-Joy. In the same year, she joined John Crowley's televised adaptation of Kate Atkinson's novel Life After Life for BBC Two, which premiered in 2022.

McKenzie will portray American gymnast Kerri Strug in Olivia Wilde's Perfect, and star in Eileen, alongside Anne Hathaway.

Personal life 
As of March 2017, McKenzie resides in Wellington, New Zealand.

Filmography

Film

Television

Awards and nominations

References

External links 

 

Living people
New Zealand film actresses
New Zealand television actresses
New Zealand child actresses
New Zealand people of English descent
New Zealand people of Scottish descent
New Zealand people of Channel Islands descent
Actresses from Wellington City
Thomasin McKenzie
21st-century New Zealand actresses
New Zealand soap opera actresses
2000 births